Rocca Canavese is a comune (municipality) in the Metropolitan City of Turin in the Italian region Piedmont, located about  northwest of Turin.

Rocca Canavese borders the following municipalities: Corio, Forno Canavese, Levone, Barbania, Vauda Canavese, Nole and San Carlo Canavese. Sights include the Santa Croce Chapel, with 15th-16th centuries frescoes, and remains of the Rocca (castle)

References